Nizhnyaya Maktama (Tübän Maqtama) is an urban locality (an urban-type settlement) in Almetyevsky District of the Republic of Tatarstan, Russia. As of the 2010 Census, its population was 9,924.

History
It was granted urban-type settlement status in 1966.

Administrative and municipal status
Within the framework of administrative divisions, the urban-type settlement of Nizhnyaya Maktama is subordinated to Almetyevsky District. As a municipal division, Nizhnyaya Maktama, together with one rural locality (the selo of Tikhonovka), is incorporated within Almetyevsky Municipal District as Nizhnyaya Maktama Urban Settlement.

References

Notes

Sources

Urban-type settlements in the Republic of Tatarstan
Bugulminsky Uyezd